Dig Deep is the fifth studio album by American progressive metal band After the Burial. The album was released on February 19, 2016 through Sumerian Records and is the band's first release since the death of guitarist Justin Lowe. It is also the final album by the band to feature founding bassist Lee Foral, who announced his departure from the band later that year in June.

Release
The release of Dig Deep was announced on January 4, 2016, when the cover art and track listing was unveiled. The first single "Lost in the Static" was released on October 29, 2015. "Collapse" was the second song released off Dig Deep, it premiered on February 4, 2016. Two days before the official album release a full album stream was made available via Metal Injection. On February 18, 2022, to commemorate the album's six-year anniversary, the band released an instrumental version of the album.

Track listing

Personnel
Writing, performance and production credits are adapted from the album liner notes.

After the Burial
 Anthony Notarmaso – lead vocals
 Trent Hafdahl – guitars, programming, backing vocals
 Lerichard "Lee" Foral – bass
 Dan Carle – drums

Additional personnel
 Will Putney – production, mixing, mastering
 After the Burial – production, mixing, mastering
 Nick Walters and Ash Avildsen – A&R
 Daniel McBride – artwork, layout

Charts

References

External links
 
 Full album stream at Metal Injection

2016 albums
After the Burial albums
Sumerian Records albums
Albums produced by Will Putney